Cameron Crighton (born 9 September 1992 in Greenock, Scotland) is a British actor, he has had small guest parts on various television shows and portrayed Kevin Smith on Channel 4 soap opera Hollyoaks.

Career
Crighton had small television and film roles in his early career, mainly on an episodic basis. In 2005 he appeared in an episode of Broken News as Calley Quin. In 2010 Crighton revealed he had done some work on the film Harry Potter and the Deathly Hallows. He was later cast in soap opera Hollyoaks as Kevin. Before Crighton's first scenes aired, his storyline was publicised by the media, who described it as an odd alien storyline. Crighton expressed his delight to be joining a show that was widely known and stated he it took ages to sink in.

Filmography

References

External links

English male film actors
English male soap opera actors
People from Brentwood, Essex
Living people
1992 births